P. Dawood Shah (29 March 1885 – 24 February 1969) was a Tamil enthusiast and scholar, Activist and a gold medalist from Madurai Tamil Sangam. He also known as "Kamba Ramayana Sahib".

Early life
Dawood Shah was born to Pappu Rowther and Kulzum biwi on 29 March 1885, in Keezh Manthoor, Tanjore district, Madras Presidency. He had his early education in Government Arts College, Kumbakonam. His classmate was a mathematics genius Ramanujan in tanjore and his Tamil teacher was the famous Tamil scholar U.V. Swaminatha Iyer.

Career
P. Dawood Shah loved the Tamil language and won a gold medal from the Madurai Tamil Sangam. He strongly advocated the replacement of Arabic with Tamil in mosques and led a campaign. He was the first person to translate the Quran into Tamil and served as the editor of the Tamil magazine Darul Islam.

Death
He died on 24 February 1969 in Madras, India.

References

1885 births
1969 deaths
People from Thanjavur district